Geoffrey 'Geoff' Bruce Foster (born May 10, 1986) is an American politician who has served as the Delegate from the 15th District to the West Virginia House of Delegates since 2014. Foster is a Republican.

Early life, education, and career
Foster was born in Charleston, West Virginia. He received his Bachelor of Science in psychology from the University of Kentucky. He is the owner of a construction supply company.

Elections

2014
In his first primary election, Foster defeated fellow Republican Duke Jordan with 61.34% of the vote to win his party's nomination.

In the general, Foster did not face a Democrat and defeated Independent Christian Watts with 79.36% of the vote.

2016
In his second primary, Foster won the nomination unopposed.

In the general, he defeated Democrat Jeffery Smith with 65.24% of the vote.

2018
In the primary, Foster was opposed by fellow Republican Bryan Hastings, whom he defeated with 37.32% of the vote.

In the general, Foster received 64.13% of the vote to defeat Democrat Casey Wade Horton and unaffiliated candidate Theresa Jackson.

2020
In his 2020 primary, Foster ran unopposed.

In the general election, Foster defeated Democrat Theresa Jackson and Libertarian Michael Young with 62.45% of the vote.

Tenure

Committee assignments
Government Organization (Vice Chair)
House Rules
Political Subdivisions
Workforce Development

Candidate ratings
As of 2019, Foster has a 100% lifetime rating from West Virginians for Life, a local anti-abortion group.

In 2018, Foster received an 88% rating from the West Virginia chapter of the United States Chamber of Commerce.

Also in 2018, Foster received an 89% rating from the American Conservative Union.

In 2018 and 2020 respectively, Foster received 0% ratings from the Sierra Club and the AFL–CIO.

COVID-19 pandemic
Foster voted for House Bill 335, which makes it more difficult for businesses to mandate the COVID-19 vaccine for their workers. The law made it easier for workers to use medical or religious exemptions to evade such mandates.

Healthcare
Foster was one of only four West Virginia legislators to vote against House Bill 4543, which capped the monthly copay for insulin at $100. Only three other Republican Delegates opposed the bill.

Transgender rights
Foster voted for Senate Bill 341, a bill that would prohibit transgender athletes from competing on the team that aligns with their gender identity.

Water Standards
Foster was supported a bill that would weaken certain water quality standards. Although the bill updates some standards, it raises the allowable concentrations of several chemicals, including some that are considered to be carcinogenic. The bill would also cede the power of West Virginia legislative committees to review changes to regulatory health criteria. The bill was criticized by local environmental groups as dangerous and irresponsible.

Worker's rights
Foster voted for SB 11, a bill that would make it more difficult for employees to strike.

Foster was the lead sponsor of House Bill 2009, which would prevent the direct collection of dues for labor unions representing public employees. Labor unions argued that direct collection of dues from paychecks was the most efficient means of raising revenue and eliminating that would result in significant cuts for the union. The law was initially suspended by lower courts but allowed by the West Virginia Supreme Court.

Personal life
Foster is a Christian.

References

Living people
1986 births
Republican Party members of the West Virginia House of Delegates
Businesspeople from Charleston, West Virginia
Politicians from Charleston, West Virginia